Muhammad Afiq bin Fazail (born 29 September 1994) is a Malaysian professional footballer who plays as a defensive midfielder for Johor Darul Ta'zim and the Malaysia national team. 

Afiq is the younger brother of Malaysian international Irfan Fazail.

Club career

Harimau Muda B
In 2014, Afiq played for Harimau Muda B which took part in S. League.

Johor Darul Ta'zim
In November 2016, Afiq was promoted to Johor Darul Ta'zim. He previously played for the feeder's side of Johor Darul Ta'zim II.

Statistics

Club

International

Honours
Johor Darul Takzim
 Malaysia Super League: 2017, 2018, 2019, 2020, 2021, 2022
Malaysia Cup: 2017, 2019, 2022
 Malaysia Charity Shield: 2018, 2019, 2020, 2021 2022, 2023
 Malaysia FA Cup: 2022

References

External links
 
 

1994 births
Malaysian footballers
Living people
People from Johor
Johor Darul Ta'zim F.C. players
Malaysia Super League players
Association football forwards
Association football midfielders
Malaysia international footballers